The 1992–93 Scottish Second Division was won by Clyde who, along with second placed Brechin City, were promoted to the First Division. Albion Rovers finished bottom.

Table

References 

Scottish Second Division seasons
Scot
3